Stenotrophomonas ginsengisoli is a Gram-negative, non-spore-forming and rod-shaped bacterium from the genus of Stenotrophomonas which has been isolated from soil from a ginseng field in Korea.

References 

Xanthomonadales
Bacteria described in 2010